Austin Murphy Allran (born December 13, 1951) is a former Republican member of the North Carolina General Assembly representing the state's forty-second Senate district, including constituents in Iredell and Catawba counties. He currently serves in a local capacity as a Catawba County Commissioner (December 2020 – present). An attorney from Hickory, North Carolina, Allran served for twelve terms in the state Senate. He was Vice-Chairman of the Agriculture/Environment/Natural Resources Committee and the Judiciary II (Criminal) Committee. He was also a member of four other committees - Education/Higher Education, Finance, Health Care, and Ways and Means.

Allran was born in Hickory, North Carolina. He graduated from Hickory High School in 1970 and then earned degrees in English and history from Duke University. Allran attended law school at Southern Methodist University, earning his degree in 1978. He married Judy Mosbach on September 27, 1980. They have two children, Elizabeth and Catherine. In 1981, Allran was elected to the North Carolina House of Representatives and in 1986 to the North Carolina Senate. He served as Republican minority whip during the 1995–1996 session.  In March 2005 Senator Allran called for the game of solitaire to be erased from the Microsoft Windows computers of state employees in his North Carolina constituency, claiming that such a move would save millions of dollars and improve productivity due to the working time lost while state employees play the game.

References

External links

|-

|-

|-

|-

1951 births
Living people
People from Hickory, North Carolina
Republican Party members of the North Carolina House of Representatives
Republican Party North Carolina state senators
Duke University Trinity College of Arts and Sciences alumni
21st-century American politicians